Johannes Jacobus "Joop" van Woerkom (May 3, 1912 in Schiedam – January 27, 1998 in Schiedam) was a Dutch water polo player who competed in the 1936 Summer Olympics. He was part of the Dutch team which finished fifth in the 1936 tournament. He played two matches as goalkeeper.

See also
 Netherlands men's Olympic water polo team records and statistics
 List of men's Olympic water polo tournament goalkeepers

References

External links
 

1912 births
1998 deaths
Dutch male water polo players
Water polo goalkeepers
Water polo players at the 1936 Summer Olympics
Olympic water polo players of the Netherlands
Sportspeople from Schiedam
20th-century Dutch people